Shishugounykus (meaning "Shishugou claw" after the Shishugou Formation where it was found) is a genus of basal alvarezsaurian dinosaur from the Shishugou Formation from Xinjiang in China. The type and only species is Shishugounykus inexpectus. The specific name refers to the unexpected discovery of another species of alvarezsaur from the Shishugou Formation (other alvarezsaurs from this formation include Haplocheirus and possibly Aorun). Its affinities to alvarezsaurs has subsequently been questioned.

References 

Alvarezsaurs
Oxfordian life
Middle Jurassic dinosaurs of Asia
Jurassic China
Fossils of China
Fossil taxa described in 2019